Niels Kokmeijer (born 30 December 1977) is a Dutch former professional footballer who played as a forward. He is the manager of the Netherlands national beach soccer team.

Career 
Kokmeijer, born in Uitgeest, North Holland, played as a forward, making his professional debut as being part of the FC Volendam squad in the 1998–99 season. He also played for SC Heerenveen and HFC Haarlem before joining Go Ahead Eagles in 2004–05, playing in the Eerste Divisie.

Leg incident 
In his first and only season at Go Ahead, Kokmeijer was seriously injured by opponent Rachid Bouaouzan playing for Sparta Rotterdam on 17 December 2004. Kokmeijer's leg was broken badly and he was forced to retire from professional football. Sparta Rotterdam suspended Bouaouzan for the rest of the season, which was more than the ten-match ban the KNVB awarded him. Besides that he was taken to court by the Dutch government and Kokmeijer for battery, a unique moment in Dutch football history. Bouaouzan received a suspended six-month jail sentence.

Career statistics

References

1977 births
Living people
People from Uitgeest
Dutch footballers
Footballers from North Holland
Association football forwards
Eerste Divisie players
FC Volendam players
SC Heerenveen players
HFC Haarlem players
Go Ahead Eagles players